Carisbrooke Castle is a historic motte-and-bailey castle located in the village of Carisbrooke (near Newport), Isle of Wight, England. Charles I was imprisoned at the castle in the months prior to his trial.

Early history
The site of Carisbrooke Castle may have been occupied in pre-Roman times. A ruined wall suggests that there was a building there in late Roman times. The Anglo-Saxon Chronicle mentions that Wihtgar, cousin of King Cynric of Wessex, died in AD 544, and was buried there. The Jutes may have taken over the fort by the late 7th century. An Anglo-Saxon stronghold occupied the site during the 8th century. Around 1000, a wall was built around the hill as a defence against Viking raids.

Later history

From 1100 the castle remained in the possession of Richard de Redvers' family, and over the next two centuries his descendants improved the castle with stone walls, towers and a keep. In 1293, Countess Isabella de Fortibus, the last Redvers resident, sold the castle to Edward I. From then on, its governance was entrusted to wardens as representatives of the crown.

In 1377, in the reign of Richard II the castle was unsuccessfully attacked by the French. It was reputedly saved by local hero Peter de Heyno who shot the French commander. Anthony Woodville, Lord Scales, later Earl Rivers, obtained a grant of the castle and rights of Lordship in 1467. He was responsible for the addition of the Woodville Gate, now known as the Entrance Gate. Woodville was killed by Richard III in 1483, but his brother Edward Woodville was given control of the castle on the accession of Henry VII in 1485.

The keep was added to the castle in the reign of Henry I, and in the reign of Elizabeth I, when the Spanish Armada was expected, it was surrounded by additional fortifications by Sir George Carey, who had been appointed Governor of the Isle of Wight in 1583. Carey later commissioned the Italian engineer Federigo Giambelli (or Genebelli) to make more substantial improvements to the defences. Starting in 1597, Giambelli constructed a modern trace Italienne fortification, a squat rampart and ditch supported at intervals by powerful bastions, which completely surrounded the old castle and bailey. The new fortification was mostly completed by 1600 at the cost of £4,000.

Charles I was imprisoned here for fourteen months before his execution in 1649. Afterwards his two youngest children were confined in the castle, and Princess Elizabeth died there. From 1896 to 1944, it was the home of Princess Beatrice, daughter of Queen Victoria, as Governor of the Isle of Wight. It is now under the control of English Heritage.

The castle is located above, and to the south of, Carisbrooke village centre.

In 2007, English Heritage opened a holiday flat inside the castle, in converted former staff quarters. The castle received 131,358 visitors during 2019.

Description

Carisbrooke was the strongest castle on the Island; though it is visible from some distance, it does not dominate the countryside like many other castles.

There are traces of a Roman fort underneath the later buildings. Seventy-one steps lead up to the keep. In the centre of the castle enclosure are the domestic buildings; these are mostly of the 13th century, with upper parts of the 16th century. Some are in ruins, but the main rooms were used as the official residence of the governor of the Isle of Wight until the 1940s, and they remain in good repair.

The Great Hall, Great Chamber and several smaller rooms are open to the public, and an upper room houses the Isle of Wight Museum. Most rooms are partly furnished.

One of the main subjects of the museum is King Charles I. He tried to escape from the castle in 1648, but was unable to get through the bars of his window.

The name of the castle is echoed in a very different structure on the other side of the world. A visit to the castle by James Macandrew, one of the founders of the New Zealand city of Dunedin, led to him naming his estate "Carisbrook". The name of the estate was later used for Dunedin's main sporting venue.

The Main Gate
The gateway tower was erected by Lord Scales who was lord of the castle at the time in 1464.

The Chapel

The chapel is located next to the main gate.

The Well-House

Near the domestic buildings is the well-house with its working donkey wheel. As it is still operated by donkeys, the wheel is a great attraction and creates long queues. The well is also famous as the hiding place of the Mohune diamond, in the 1898 adventure novel Moonfleet, by J. Meade Falkner. Wyndham Lewis, who lived on the Isle of Wight as a child, cites the donkey wheel at Carisbrooke as an image for the way machines impose a way of life on human beings ('Inferior Religions', published 1917).

The Constable's Chamber
The Constable's Chamber is a large room located in the castle's medieval section. It was the bedroom of Charles I when he was imprisoned in the castle, and Princess Beatrice used it as a dining room. It is now home to Charles I bed as well as Princess Beatrice's large collection of stag and antelope heads. This room was used as the castle's education centre up until recently.

Earthworks
Surrounding the whole castle are large earthworks, designed by the Italian Federigo Gianibelli, and begun in the year before the Spanish Armada. They were finished in the 1590s. The outer gate has the date 1598 and the arms of Elizabeth I.

List of constables of Carisbrooke Castle

See also
Castles in Great Britain and Ireland
List of castles in England

References

External links

 Carisbrooke Castle official English Heritage information
 Carisbrooke Castle Museum official site
 'Carisbrooke Castle: island fortress and royal prison' on Google Arts & Culture
 Carisbrooke Church from Blacks Guide to the Isle of Wight, 1870
 Benjamin Franklin's description of Carisbrooke from Journal of a Voyage, 1726

Castles on the Isle of Wight
English Heritage sites in the Isle of Wight
Grade I listed buildings on the Isle of Wight
Museums on the Isle of Wight
History museums on the Isle of Wight
Historic house museums on the Isle of Wight
Local museums on the Isle of Wight
Motte-and-bailey castles